Václav Tereba (21 August 1918 – 22 February 1990), was a Czechoslovak international table tennis player.

He won twenty World Table Tennis Championship medals   including four gold medals as part of the Czechoslovakia men's team event.

In addition he won four silver medals, three in the men's team event and one in the mixed doubles with Marie Kettnerová and twelve bronze medals, three in the men's team, one in the men's singles, one in the mixed doubles and six in the men's doubles with four different partners, Adolf Slar, Stanislav Kolář, Josef Turnovsky and Ludvik Vyhnanovsky.

Other achievements included victory in the open English Championships in 1947. He died in 1990 and his son is Stanislav Tereba.

See also
 List of table tennis players
 List of World Table Tennis Championships medalists

References

Czech male table tennis players
1918 births
1990 deaths
World Table Tennis Championships medalists